

Organizations and institutions 
 Schools:
 Heartland Baptist Bible College
 Heartland Community College, in Illinois 
 Heartland Elementary School, part of the Blue Valley Unified School District, Kansas, USA
 Heartland Institute, political research
 Commercial and industrial:
 Heartland Payment Systems
 Heartland Corridor, American transportation complex
 Heartland Flyer, railroad route
 Heartland Inn, chain of hotels based in Iowa, USA
 Occasional events 
 Heartland Film Festival in Indiana
 Heartland Pagan Festival

Sports 
 Leagues:
 Heartland League, independent baseball league that operated from 1996–98 in the central United States
 Heartland Conference, American NCAA Division II college athletic conference
 Heartland Collegiate Athletic Conference (HCAC), American NCAA Division III college athletic conference
 Heartland Wrestling Association, independent wrestling promotion based in Cincinnati, Ohio, USA
 Teams:
 Heartland F.C., formerly Iwuanyanwu Nationale, Nigerian soccer club based in Owerri, Nigeria
 St. Louis Heartland Eagles, Tier 1 junior ice hockey team playing in the West Division of the United States Hockey League (USHL)
 Heartland Championship, amateur domestic rugby union competition in New Zealand
 Heartland Park Topeka, multi-purpose motorsports facility south of Topeka, Kansas, USA
 Heartland Trophy, brass bull presented to the winner of the Iowa–Wisconsin American football game

See also  
 Hartland (disambiguation)